Jason Andrew Kitzmiller (born July 25, 1973) is an American professional stock car racing driver. He last competed part-time in the NASCAR Camping World Truck Series, driving the No. 97 Chevrolet Silverado for CR7 Motorsports and the ARCA Menards Series, driving the No. 97 Chevrolet Camaro for CR7.

Racing career

Early racing career

ARCA Menards Series
Kitzmiller would announce his debut in the ARCA Menards Series in 2020, driving the No. 97 Chevrolet for CR7 Motorsports in a press release, saying "Without a doubt, this will be the biggest race of my career thus far and I've got a ton of knowledge and support behind me, I just hope to mind my manners and keep our No. 97 CR7 Motorsports Chevrolet out of trouble." He would finish 32nd with engine troubles. Throughout the season, he would make six more starts with CR7 Motorsports, earning two top 10s that year at Talladega and Michigan. He would end up finishing 18th in the standings with 212 points.

In 2021, he would return to the series, again with CR7 Motorsports as a part-timer. In six races, he would not get any top 10s, with a best of 11th at Daytona and Charlotte. He would have a worse season in 2021, finishing 24th in the standings with 177 points.

ARCA Menards Series East
Kitzmiller would make his debut in the ARCA Menards Series East in a combination event with the ARCA Menards Series at the 2020 Bush's Beans 200, finishing 13th. He would race in the next year's Bristol race, this time finishing 22nd.

NASCAR Camping World Truck Series
On February 10, 2022, CR7 Motorsports announced that Kitzmiller will make his NASCAR Camping World Truck Series start in the 2022 NextEra Energy 250, driving the No. 97, which is his main ARCA number, for a second entry. However, he withdrew from the event after crashing his primary truck in practice and not having a backup truck.

Personal life
Kitzmiller has been the president of A. L. L. Construction, a construction company in West Virginia.

Motorsports career results

NASCAR
(key) (Bold – Pole position awarded by qualifying time. Italics – Pole position earned by points standings or practice time. * – Most laps led.)

Camping World Truck Series

ARCA Menards Series
(key) (Bold – Pole position awarded by qualifying time. Italics – Pole position earned by points standings or practice time. * – Most laps led.)

ARCA Menards Series East

References

External links
 

1973 births
Living people
ARCA Menards Series drivers
NASCAR drivers
Racing drivers from West Virginia
Sportspeople from West Virginia
People from Petersburg, West Virginia